Encore Films is a film distribution and production company based in Singapore. It distributes primarily Japanese and other Asian content in Singapore, Malaysia, Indonesia, Vietnam, Brunei, Hong Kong and Taiwan. Some titles released by Encore Films include the Death Note film series, Non-Stop, The Forbidden Kingdom, Dragon Blade, Cold War 1 & 2, Attack on Titan 1 & 2 as well as Studio Ghibli's animations Ponyo on the Cliff by the Sea and The Wind Rises. In 2016, the company produced and released its first Singapore production Young & Fabulous.

History 
The company was founded in 2003 by Singaporean director and producer Joyce Lee, with the aim of "bringing quality films to the audience in the South East Asia region". Its sister company Simply Fun handles video distribution, cinematic subtitling and other post-production services.

Distribution

Notable releases 
The Death Note film series, which includes Death Note, Death Note 2: The Last Name, spin-off L Change the World and Death Note: Light Up The New World, has been the box office record holder for Japanese films for the past 11 years. The four films grossed over S$5.2 million combined, and went on to become the No. 1 Japanese film series in Singapore. 

Both Dragon Blade and Attack on Titan were among the top 10 Asian films in Singapore in 2015, with box office takings of S$2.6 million and S$821,500 respectively. The Dragon Blade cast – Jackie Chan, John Cusack, Adrien Brody, Choi Si-won, Lin Peng, and Mika Wang – visited Singapore in February 2015 for the film press conference, red carpet and gala premiere event.

Cold War 2 became one of the top 10 Asian films in Singapore in 2016, with a box office performance of S$2.1 million. In July 2016, the stars of Cold War 2 – Chow Yun Fat, Aaron Kwok, and Eddie Peng – promoted the film in Singapore with a press conference, red carpet and gala premiere event held at Marina Bay Sands. The sequel topped the box office during its opening weekend, and eventually doubled the box office earnings of its first film.

The company released Makoto Shinkai's  animation your name. in Vietnam in January 2017, which became the No. 1 Japanese film in the country.

Production 
Produced and co-directed by Joyce Lee, the company's first film production Young & Fabulous was produced at a S$1.5 million budget, and starred Aloysius Pang, Malaysian Internet celebrity Joyce Chu, Joshua Tan of Ah Boys to Men, Gurmit Singh, Henry Thia, Quan Yi Fong, Jeffrey Xu and Jordan Ng. The film is a coming-of-age story about three teenagers who strive to overcome numerous obstacles in order to fulfil their dreams. It grossed over S$1.3 million at the Singapore box office, and was one of four Singaporean films to hit S$1 million at the local box office. Young & Fabulous also became one of the top 10 Asian films in Singapore in 2016. The film was subsequently released in Malaysia, Indonesia, and Vietnam.

References

External links 
 

Film production companies of Singapore
Film distributors